Gahour is a village located in the Ludhiana West tehsil, of Ludhiana district, Punjab.

Demographics-
As of 2011, Gahour has a total of 318 households. Out of the population 168 people are under 6 years old; of those 93 are male and 75 female.

External links
  Villages in Ludhiana West Tehsil

References

Villages in Ludhiana West tehsil